Konstantin Georgiyevich Zyryanov (born 5 October 1977) is a Russian football manager and a former player of Komi descent. He is the manager of Chernomorets Novorossiysk.

Club career

Early career and Amkar Perm
Zyryanov started to play football in local club Zvezda Perm. His professional career began with Amkar, in 1994. He played 171 league games, having scored in 48 occasions. In 1998, Zyryanov won Russian Second Division with Amkar and in 2000, he joined Torpedo Moscow.

Torpedo Moscow
Upon joining Torpedo, Zyryanov switched to their reserve team, where he played two games, scoring once. After that, he became a first squad regular. He was one of the most important Torpedo players, where he made 164 league appearances and scored nine goals. His playing ability brought him to Russian football giant Zenit Saint Petersburg in 2007.

Zenit Saint Petersburg
Zenit's late-developing holding midfielder was named Russian Footballer of the Year by Futbol and Sport-Express in 2007; in August alone he scored six league goals for Zenit.

Zyryanov also played at the back and, in addition, was used in a creative/goalscoring role by then Zenit coach Dick Advocaat.  He was described as a "calm facilitator, keeping the ball moving and rarely losing possession" as he played in front of defenders.

In 2008, he scored against Bayern Munich in the semi-finals of the 2007–08 UEFA Cup to help earn his side a place in the final against Scottish club Rangers. He followed that up with the second goal in the final against Rangers to give Zenit a 2–0 victory and lift the title. Since then, Zyryanov became one of the finest Russian players, and one of the most important parts of Zenit and Russian national team.

Following the expiration of Zyryanov's Zenit contract, he signed a one-year contract with their farm club Zenit-2 St. Petersburg as a player-coach.

On 27 December 2017, he officially retired as a player and was appointed the manager of Zenit-2.

International career

Euro 2008
On 14 June 2008, Zyryanov scored for Russia in the 33rd minute of their second match in Euro 2008's Group D against Greece. Russia won the match 1–0. He was later named in the Euro 2008 Team of the tournament.

Personal life
Zyryanov was struck by tragedy in August 2002 when his wife Olga, who was a drug addict, jumped from their eighth floor apartment holding the hand of his four-year-old daughter. His daughter died that evening and his wife died a month later. His father and brother died two years before that. His new partner Natalia gave birth to their first child, a boy they called Lev, on 20 September 2008. He married Natalia on 9 June 2010. Their second child, a girl named Polina, was born on 9 January 2012.

Career statistics

Club

International

International goals
Scores and results list. Russia's goal tally first:

Honours

Club
Amkar Perm
Russian Second Division: 1998

Zenit St. Petersburg
Russian Premier League: 2007, 2010, 2011–12
Russian Cup: 2009–10
Russian Super Cup: 2008, 2011
UEFA Cup: 2007–08
UEFA Super Cup: 2008

International
Russia
 UEFA European Championship bronze medalist: 2008

Individual
 Russian Footballer of the Year (awarded by Futbol and Sport-Express): 2007
 Gentleman of the Year (awarded by Komsomolskaya Pravda): 2007
 UEFA Euro Team of the Tournament: 2008

References

External links

 Profile at the official FC Zenit St. Petersburg website 

1977 births
Living people
Komi people
Association football midfielders
Russian footballers
Russia under-21 international footballers
Russia international footballers
FC Zenit Saint Petersburg players
UEFA Cup winning players
FC Torpedo Moscow players
FC Torpedo-2 players
FC Amkar Perm players
Sportspeople from Perm, Russia
Russian Premier League players
UEFA Euro 2008 players
UEFA Euro 2012 players
FC Zenit-2 Saint Petersburg players
Russian football managers
FC Chernomorets Novorossiysk managers